Stefano Lorenzi (born 18 January 1977) is an Italian professional footballer.

He played 5 seasons (42 games, 1 goal) in the Serie A for Atalanta B.C., A.C. ChievoVerona and Treviso F.C. 1993.

Lorenzi joined Treviso in co-ownership deal for €100,000. In June 2006 Atalanta gave up the remain 50% registration rights. Lorenzi's contract expired on 30 June 2008.

References

External links
 
 aic.football.it

1977 births
Living people
Italian footballers
Serie A players
Serie B players
Serie C players
Serie D players
Atalanta B.C. players
A.C. ChievoVerona players
S.S. Arezzo players
Treviso F.B.C. 1993 players
Delfino Pescara 1936 players
Pisa S.C. players
S.P.A.L. players
Association football defenders
People from Calcinate
Sportspeople from the Province of Bergamo
Footballers from Lombardy